The Halimeda ghost pipefish, Solenostomus halimeda, is a species of false pipefishes belonging to the family Solenostomidae.

Description
Its body is most often green, but can be red or any other color of the algae or coral in which it is hiding. This cryptic species looks very similar to the macroalga Halimeda. This uncommon species is related to pipefishes and seahorses. It can be distinguished by its large head that is about the same length as the rest of its body. The caudal fin is small and similar in form and size to the dorsal and pectoral fins.

Behavior
These fish float nearly motionless, with their mouths facing downwards, around a background that makes them nearly impossible to see. They feed on tiny crustaceans, sucked inside through their long snouts. Unlike true pipefish, female Halimeda ghost pipefish carry their fertilised eggs between their pelvic fins, which are modified to form a brood pouch, until the eggs are ready to hatch.

Distribution
This species lives in the Indian Ocean and in the Western Indo-Pacific, from the Maldives to the Marshall Islands.

Habitat

References

 Debelius H. Indian Ocean Reef Guide. Frankfurt: IKAN Unterwasserarchiv, 2006. Page 63.

External links
 Fishes of Australia : Solenostomus halimeda
 

Solenostomus
Fish described in 2002
Taxa named by James Wilder Orr
Taxa named by John Ernest Randall